The Pentax K-S2 is a weather-sealed digital SLR camera announced by Ricoh on February 9, 2015. It is the first Pentax SLR to feature an articulated LCD, and it is the smallest DSLR to include this feature and also be weather-sealed. In 2015, the K-S2 won the TIPA Award in the category Best Digital SLR Advanced.

Its release is also the debut of a new retractable kit lens that it will be bundled with, the SMC Pentax-DA L 18-50mm f/4-5.6 DC WR RE - Pentax' second kit lens after the 18-135mm model to have a "silent" focus motor.

The K-S2 also does not have an AA filter which increases sharpness but makes it more susceptible to moiré. The K-S2 comes in 7 color combinations.

It has been in limited availability in North America and other markets since Summer of 2017, but was still an active product on the Ricoh Imaging, Japan Web site as of 5 December 2017; the slightly more advanced K-70 would be the nearest replacement model.

References

External links 
Technical data at dpreview.com

K-S2
Live-preview digital cameras
Cameras introduced in 2015
Pentax K-mount cameras